Elizabeth MacLeod is a Canadian author. Her biographies are written for elementary students.

Bibliography

Biographies
Alexander Graham Bell: An Inventive Life, Kids Can Press (Toronto, Ontario, Canada), 1999. 
Review, School Library Journal, 1999
Review, Booklist, 1999
Lucy Maud Montgomery: A Writer's Life, Kids Can Press (Toronto, Ontario, Canada), 2001.
The Wright Brothers: A Flying Start, Kids Can Press (Toronto, Ontario, Canada), 2002.
Review, School Library Journal, 2002
Review, Booklist, 2002
Albert Einstein: A Life of Genius, Kids Can Press (Toronto, Ontario, Canada), 2003.
Helen Keller: A Determined Life, Kids Can Press (Toronto, Ontario, Canada), 2004.
Review, School Library Journal, 2004
Review, Booklist, 2004
Marie Curie: A Brilliant Life, Kids Can Press (Toronto, Ontario, Canada), 2004.
Review, Booklist, 2004
Harry Houdini: A Magical Life, Kids Can Press (Toronto, Ontario, Canada), 2005.

Other works
MacLeod, Elizabeth, and June Bradford. Bake and Make Amazing Cakes. Kids can do it. Toronto: Kids Can Press, 2001. ISBN   
Review, School Library Journal, 2001.
MacLeod, Elizabeth and Frieda Wishinsky. Illustrated by Qin Leng. A History of Just About Everything: 180 Events, People and Inventions That Changed the World Toronto:Kids Can Press (2013), finalist for Norma Fleck Award 
MacLeod, Elizabeth, illustrated by Sydney Smith Canada Year by Year Toronto: Kids Can Press (2016). received the Norma Fleck Award

References

Canadian biographers
Living people
Year of birth missing (living people)